ČSD Class E 499.3 electric locomotives were used primarily for passenger trains in Czechoslovakia. Locomotives which passed to České dráhy, rail operator in the Czech Republic are now classified as Class 163, those which passed to ZSSK, rail operator in Slovakia, are also Class 163.

E 499.3 locomotives operate on the 3,000 V DC system and are essentially a DC only version of the ES 499.1.

ČD Class 163.2 and some ZSSK Class 163 locomotives were rebuilt from ČD and ZSSK Class 162. This was caused by lack of fast dual system locomotives as only one Class 362 locomotive was built. This situation solved ČD by switching the bogies between locomotives of ČD Class 363 (same as ŽSR/ZSSK Class 363) and Class 162, ŽSR by switching only the speed-change box and axletrees between Class 363 and Class 162. After that procedure, the locomotives were classified ČD and ŽSR/ZSSK Class 362 and ČD Class 163.2 and ŽSR/ZSSK Class 163.

History 
The locomotive was produced in the years 1984-1992 in four series of 20, 40 (2nd and 3rd serie) and 60 engines.

Because it was a slightly modified version of ČSD Class ES 499.1, there weren't any prototypes built. The first series of locomotives were sent to Ústí nad Labem, next two series were sent to Olomouc, Košice and Česká Třebová. Currently, the ČD are units in Česká Třebová, Děčín and Bohumín and ZSSK units in Košice and Žilina.

Modernisation 
All 30 locomotives owned by ČD Cargo were rebuilt to class 363.5 (dual voltage) by Škoda. ZSSK announced tender for rebuilding 15 locomotives class 163/162 to class 361, which was won by ŽOS Vrútky. As of January, 2014, 5 locomotives of class 361 (dual voltage, max. speed 140 km/h) and 4 locomotives of class 361.1 (dual voltage, max. speed 160 km/h) were built.

Since 2013, they were used for operation in push-pull sets with driving trailers and they were used mostly operate services in various commuter trains.

Service in other countries

Italy

E.630 
Because of the financial problems of ČSD (and then ČD and ŽSR) after the Velvet revolution, Škoda rebuilt 9 pieces of the fourth series and sold them to FNM, Italy. These were classified as FNM Class E.630. In 2010, all E630 locomotives were sold to Czech private operator RegioJet and were rebuilt to class 162.

Disposition

As of 2008-06-19, 38 163s remained in service with ZSSK, 30 with ČD Cargo and 78 with ČD, as at 2008-03-02.

See also
List of České dráhy locomotive classes

References

External links 

 Czech and Slovak Railway Group in English

Škoda locomotives
Bo′Bo′ locomotives
Electric locomotives of Czechoslovakia
Electric locomotives of Slovakia
Electric locomotives of the Czech Republic
3000 V DC locomotives
Railway locomotives introduced in 1984
Standard gauge locomotives of Czechoslovakia
Standard gauge locomotives of the Czech Republic
Standard gauge locomotives of Slovakia
Bo′Bo′ electric locomotives of Europe